The Newberry 1919 lynching attempt was the attempted lynching of Elisha Harper, Newberry, South Carolina on July 24, 1919. Harper was sent to jail for insulting a 14 year-old girl.

Attempted lynching
 
Elisha Harper, 25 years old, was the son of the Rev. T. F. Harper, a respectable and "well-behaved preacher" living in Helena. He fought in the Army during World War I and just returned from Europe. On July 24, 1919, while walking the streets of Newberry, South Carolina he allegedly insulted a 14-year-old girl who promptly reported him to the authorities. He was arrested and thrown in jail. Soon a white mob had gathered and would have lynched Harper if it wasn't for Sheriff Blease who bundled and hid him away.

Aftermath

This uprising was one of several incidents of civil unrest that began in the so-called American Red Summer, of 1919. The Summer consisted of terrorist attacks on black communities, and white oppression in over three dozen cities and counties. In most cases, white mobs attacked African American neighborhoods. In some cases, black community groups resisted the attacks, especially in Chicago and Washington, D.C. Most deaths occurred in rural areas during events like the Elaine Race Riot in Arkansas, where an estimated 100 to 240 black people and 5 white people were killed. Also occurring in 1919 were the Chicago Race Riot and Washington D.C. race riot which killed 38 and 39 people respectively, and with both having many more non-fatal injuries and extensive property damage reaching up into the millions of dollars.

See also
Washington race riot of 1919
Mass racial violence in the United States
List of incidents of civil unrest in the United States

Bibliography 
Notes

References   

1919 in South Carolina
1919 in military history
1919 riots in the United States
July 1919 events
African-American history between emancipation and the civil rights movement
History of racism in South Carolina
Racially motivated violence against African Americans
Red Summer
Riots and civil disorder in South Carolina
White American riots in the United States
Lynching attempts